Eyo! is the eleventh studio album by the Belgian-Dutch girlgroup K3. The album was released on 18 November 2011 through label Studio 100. Three singles were released to promote the album: "Hallo K3", "Eyo!" and "Willem-Alexander". Eyo! reached the peak position in both the Dutch and Flemish album charts.

Track listing

Chart performance

Weekly charts

Year-end charts

Certifications

References

External links 
http://www.k3.be (official website) (Dutch)
https://web.archive.org/web/20120425052902/http://subsites.studio100.be/K3site/eyo/ (official site of the new album) (Dutch)

K3 (band) albums
2011 albums